Gordon is a town in Houston County, Alabama, United States. It was incorporated in February 1872. It is part of the Dothan, Alabama Metropolitan Statistical Area. At the 2010 census the population was 332, down from 408 in 2000.

Geography
Gordon is located in eastern Houston County at  (31.143171, -85.096114). It is bordered to the northeast by the Chattahoochee River, which forms the Alabama–Georgia border, and to the south by U.S. Route 84. US 84 leads west  to Dothan and southeast  to Bainbridge, Georgia. Alabama State Route 95 passes through the north and east sides of Gordon, leading north  to Columbia and south  to the Florida state line.

Demographics

2020 census

As of the 2020 United States census, there were 294 people, 113 households, and 68 families residing in the town.

2000 census
As of the census of 2000, there were 408 people, 144 households, and 108 families residing in the town. The racial makeup of the town was 74.02% Black or African American, 23.04% White, 0.74% Native American, 0.25% Asian, 0.25% from other races, and 1.72% from two or more races. 1.47% of the population were Hispanic or Latino of any race.

There were 144 households, out of which 41.0% had children under the age of 18 living with them, 47.2% were married couples living together, 22.2% had a female householder with no husband present, and 25.0% were non-families. 25.0% of all households were made up of individuals, and 11.1% had someone living alone who was 65 years of age or older. The average household size was 2.83 and the average family size was 3.33.

In the town, the population was spread out, with 33.8% under the age of 18, 7.4% from 18 to 24, 22.5% from 25 to 44, 24.0% from 45 to 64, and 12.3% who were 65 years of age or older. The median age was 35 years. For every 100 females, there were 84.6 males. For every 100 females age 18 and over, there were 78.8 males.

The median income for a household in the town was $16,917, and the median income for a family was $17,708. Males had a median income of $25,625 versus $15,536 for females. The per capita income for the town was $6,795. About 30.3% of families and 39.9% of the population were below the poverty line, including 48.9% of those under age 18 and 19.4% of those age 65 or over.

Gallery
Below are photographs taken in Gordon as part of the Historic American Buildings Survey:

References 

Towns in Houston County, Alabama
Towns in Alabama
Dothan metropolitan area, Alabama
Alabama populated places on the Chattahoochee River